The Korean water toad, Korean toad, water toad, or Stejneger's toad (Bufo stejnegeri), is a species of toad found in East Asia.  Two distinct populations are known to exist, one in eastern Liaoning province of northeastern China, and one in the central mountains of the Korean Peninsula.  Within South Korea, it is found in eastern Gyeonggi (specifically Gapyeong) and also in Gangwon-do (particularly the Odaesan mountain complex).  In addition, it is expected that there are or have been additional populations in the region between central Korea and Liaoning.

The classification of the Korean water toad into the genus Bufo was challenged in a 2006 paper. However, no alternative classification was proposed and the species is at present provisionally allocated to Bufo.

The Korean water toad is found inland, at elevations from 200 to 700 meters above sea level.  As its name suggests, it favors water, and is typically found in wooded riparian areas.  Breeding and egg-laying take place in the waters of streams and rivers.  The water toad is typically nocturnal, but is also active during the day during the summer rains.

Because of their superficial similarity to frogs, Korean water toads are sometimes eaten. However, like other toads, they are poisonous. A case of severe poisoning from a digoxin-like immunoreactive substance was reported in 1998.

References

Bufo
Frogs of China
Amphibians of Korea
Amphibians described in 1931
Taxa named by Karl Patterson Schmidt